Stuart Jones (born 24 October 1977) is an English former professional footballer who played as a goalkeeper.

Career
Born in Bristol, Jones began as a trainee at Reading. He then began his senior career in 1997 with non-league side Weston-super-Mare. Jones moved to the Football League side Sheffield Wednesday in March 1998, but he never made a first team appearance for Wednesday. While at Wednesday, Jones spent loan spells at both Crewe Alexandra (where he did not make a single first-team appearance) his senior career with Torquay United. After a month at Torquay, Jones made his transfer permanent, and spent a further two years at the club. Over both his spells with the club, Jones a total of thirty-two appearances in the Football League for Torquay. Jones then played non-league football for Chester City, and in Wales for Barry Town, where he made one league appearance, before returning to his first club Weston-super-Mare. Jones then returned to English League football, making three appearances for Brighton & Hove Albion during the 2003–2004 season, and four appearances for Doncaster Rovers during the 2004–05 season. Jones later played non-league football for Accrington Stanley, making a further two appearances.

In May 2018, Jones was appointed manager of Western Football League Division One side Ashton & Backwell United. In April 2021, he stepped down from his role at the club.

References

External links
 (1997–2002)
 (2004–2006)
Non League Daily

1977 births
Living people
English footballers
Reading F.C. players
Weston-super-Mare A.F.C. players
Sheffield Wednesday F.C. players
Crewe Alexandra F.C. players
Torquay United F.C. players
Gloucester City A.F.C. players
Chester City F.C. players
Barry Town United F.C. players
Brighton & Hove Albion F.C. players
Doncaster Rovers F.C. players
Accrington Stanley F.C. players
English Football League players
Association football goalkeepers
English football managers